Qiwllaqucha (Quechua qillwa, qiwlla, qiwiña gull, qucha lake, "gull lake", hispanicized spelling Quiullacocha) is a small lake in Peru located in the Apurímac Region, Cotabambas Province, Cotabambas District, south-east of Cotabambas.

References 

Lakes of Peru
Lakes of Apurímac Region